KF Belshi is an Albanian football club based in Belsh. They are currently not competing in the senior football league.

References

Belsh